Rhadinosticta handschini is a species of damselfly in the family Isostictidae.
It has been reported from northern Australia, where it inhabits streams.
Rhadinosticta handschini is a slender, medium-sized, dully-coloured damselfly.

See also
 List of Odonata species of Australia

Notes 
The taxonomic difference between Rhadinosticta handschini and Rhadinosticta banksi is uncertain. They may not be separate species.

References 

Isostictidae
Odonata of Australia
Insects of Australia
Taxa named by Maurits Anne Lieftinck
Insects described in 1933
Damselflies